Gábor Boros (born 26 September 1997) is a Hungarian professional footballer who plays for Diósgyőri VTK.

Club statistics

Updated to games played as of 5 August 2019.

References

1997 births
Living people
Sportspeople from Rimavská Sobota
Hungarian footballers
Hungary youth international footballers
Association football forwards
Kazincbarcikai SC footballers
Budafoki LC footballers
Diósgyőri VTK players
Nemzeti Bajnokság I players